The list of shipwrecks in July 1824 includes some ships sunk, foundered, grounded, or otherwise lost during July 1824.

1 July

2 July

4 July

5 July

8 July

9 July

12 July

13 July

15 July

18 July

20 July

21 July

23 July

24 July

25 July

26 July

29 July

30 July

31 July

Unknown date

References

1824-07